Miantonomi Memorial Park is a public park between Hillside Avenue and Girard Avenue in Newport, Rhode Island.

The Narragansett Indians used the area around the park for hundreds of years and the park (and the hill it is on) is named after Sachem, or Chief, Miantonomi.  This hill was Miantonomi's seat of power until it was purchased by English colonists in 1637.  The settlers used the hill as a lookout and in 1667 built a beacon on the hill.  During the American Revolutionary War fortifications were built on the hill, fragments of which still survive.  In 1921, the City of Newport received the property from the local Stokes family.  

Miantonomi Memorial Park's  became part of the Aquidneck Land Trust through an easement in 2005.

Tower 
The Park Commission built a stone tower in 1929 as a World War I memorial.  On September 27, 2017, the Miantonomi Memorial Park Tower was named an official WWI Centennial memorial and will receive grant funds towards restoration and maintenance.

See also
National Register of Historic Places listings in Newport County, Rhode Island

References

External links

Park Information

Parks on the National Register of Historic Places in Rhode Island
Parks in Rhode Island
Buildings and structures in Newport, Rhode Island
National Register of Historic Places in Newport, Rhode Island
1637 establishments in Rhode Island
Geography of Newport, Rhode Island
Tourist attractions in Newport, Rhode Island
Protected areas of Newport County, Rhode Island